The 1999–2000 Valparaiso Crusaders men's basketball team represented Valparaiso University during the 1999–2000 NCAA Division I men's basketball season. The Crusaders, led by 12th-year head coach Homer Drew, played their home games at the Athletics–Recreation Center as members of the Mid-Continent Conference. Valpo finished second in the Mid-Con regular season standings, but went on to win the Mid-Con tournament to receive an automatic bid to the NCAA tournament. As No. 16 seed in the Midwest region, the Crusaders lost to No. 1 seed an eventual National champion Michigan State, 65–38, to finish with a record of 19–13 (10–6 Mid-Con).

Roster

Schedule and results

|-
!colspan=9 style=| Regular season

|-
!colspan=12 style=| Mid-Con tournament

|-
!colspan=12 style=| NCAA tournament

Source

References

Valparaiso
Valparaiso Beacons men's basketball seasons
Valparaiso
Valparaiso Crusaders men's basketball
Valparaiso Crusaders men's basketball